This is a list of the municipalities in the state of Paraná (PR), located in the South Region of Brazil. Paraná is divided into 399 municipalities, which are grouped into 39 microregions, which are grouped into 10 mesoregions.

See also
Geography of Brazil
List of cities in Brazil

Parana